The enzyme L-fuconate dehydratase catalyzes the chemical reaction

L-fuconate  2-dehydro-3-deoxy-L-fuconate + H2O

This enzyme belongs to the family of lyases, specifically the hydro-lyases, which cleave carbon-oxygen bonds.  The systematic name of this enzyme class is L-fuconate hydro-lyase (2-dehydro-3-deoxy-L-fuconate-forming). This enzyme is also called L-fuconate hydro-lyase.

References

 

EC 4.2.1
Enzymes of unknown structure